Erbium(III) chloride is a violet solid with the formula . It is used in the preparation of erbium metal.

Preparation

Anhydrous erbium(III) chloride can be produced by the ammonium chloride route. In the first step, erbium(III) oxide is heated with ammonium chloride to produce the ammonium salt of the pentachloride:

In the second step, the ammonium chloride salt is converted to the trichloride by heating in a vacuum at 350-400 ºC:

Structural data
Erbium(III) chloride forms crystals of the  type, with monoclinic crystals and the point group C2/m.

Erbium(III) chloride hexahydrate also forms monoclinic crystals with the point group of P2/n (P2/c) - C42h. In this compound, erbium is octa-coordinated to form  ions with the isolated  completing the structure.

Optical properties
Erbium(III) chloride solutions show a negative nonlinear absorption effect.

Catalytic properties
The use of erbium(III) chloride as a catalyst has been demonstrated in the acylation of alcohols and phenols and in an amine functionalisation of furfural. It is a catalyst for Friedel–Crafts-type reactions, and can be used in place of cerium(III) chloride for Luche reductions.

References

Erbium compounds
Chlorides
Lanthanide halides